Manuel Rodrigo Simpertegui Flores (born 4 January 1988) is a Chilean former footballer who played as a defender.

External links
 
 

1988 births
Living people
People from Concepción Province, Chile
Chilean footballers
Chilean expatriate footballers
Deportes Concepción (Chile) footballers
Deportes Temuco footballers
A.C. Barnechea footballers
Santiago Morning footballers
Cobreloa footballers
Independiente de Cauquenes footballers
Chilean Primera División players
Primera B de Chile players
Segunda División Profesional de Chile players
Torneo Argentino B players
Chilean expatriate sportspeople in Argentina
Expatriate footballers in Argentina
Association football defenders